The 7.5 cm Pak 41 was one of the last German anti-tank guns brought into service and used in World War II and notable for being one of the largest anti-tank guns to rely on the Gerlich principle (pioneered by the German gun-designer Hermann Gerlich, who developed the principle in the 1920s, reportedly for a hunting rifle) to deliver a higher muzzle velocity and therefore greater penetration in relation to its size.

It is similar to, but distinct from, the Waffe 0725, which, while also based on the Gerlich principle, had a different barrel calibre.

Design and development 
Designed and built by Krupp AG to compete with the Rheinmetall 7.5 cm Pak 40, the Pak 41 was intended from the onset to take advantage of the Gerlich principle to increase shot velocity. In addition to its squeeze bore design and the use of a tungsten core flanged shell, the Pak 41 incorporated several novel features. One feature was that the barrel was split into three distinct sections: the rear part was parallel-sided and conventionally rifled; the central part was unrifled and tapered down; at the muzzle end, the last  was parallel-sided again but remained unrifled. Another novel feature was the attachment of the split trail legs and solid rubber tires directly to the Gun shield to save weight. The gun cradle was set inside a special ball mount attached to the Gun shield. The cradle itself was cylindrical, covering the whole of the rear half of the barrel.

The weight of the powder charge fired is 95 percent of the weight of the projectile, which had an estimated velocity of approximately 1200 m/s (4,000 f/s), and a penetration of 15 cm (5.94 inches) of homogeneous armor at 900 m (1,000 yards).
The reinforced breech is of the vertical wedge type, with a semi-automatic action. Compared to the PaK 38 and the PaK 40, the appearance was long, low, and sturdy.

The gun is sighted up to 1,500 meters; the sight has four scales for use according to the actual muzzle velocity of the gun. The barrel life is provisionally estimated as 500 to 600 rounds.

Service 
When first introduced, the 7.5 cm Pak 41's performance would seem to indicate that it might supplant the Pak 40 as the standard issue anti-tank gun for the Wehrmacht. However, the emergent shell's velocity tended to drop dramatically over long range and accuracy and penetration suffered as a consequence. This factor, along with a growing shortage of tungsten, which was needed for the gun's special ammunition, would ensure that only 150 Pak 41's would ever be produced. Most Pak 41's were scrapped when their barrels had worn out and / or their ammunition supply was exhausted, although it is believed that a small number of Pak 41's were converted to accept 7.5 cm Pak 40 barrels and components.

A small number were known to have been mounted on halftracks and used as lightly armored tank destroyers.

Ammunition

Pzgr 41 (HK)

An armour-piercing, composite, non-rigid projectile with a sub-calibre tungsten core and tracer.
 Weight of projectile: 2.6 kg
 Muzzle velocity: 1230 m/s

Pzgr 41 (W) - APCNR
An armour-piercing, non-rigid projectile with tracer for practice only.
 Weight of projectile: 2.5 kg
 Muzzle velocity: 1230 m/s

See also
 Littlejohn adaptor

References and sources
Notes

Sources
 Gander, Terry and Chamberlain, Peter. Weapons of the Third Reich: An Encyclopedic Survey of All Small Arms, Artillery and Special Weapons of the German Land Forces 1939-1945. New York: Doubleday, 1979 
 Hogg, Ian V. German Artillery of World War Two. 2nd corrected edition. Mechanicsville, PA: Stackpole Books, 1997

External links
 http://www.lonesentry.com/articles/ttt/75mm-tapered-bore-antitank-pak-41.html

World War II anti-tank guns of Germany
75 mm artillery
Weapons and ammunition introduced in 1941